Daniel García González (born 9 October 1984 in Andorra la Vella, Andorra) is an Andorran judoka. He competed in the Men's 66 kg category at the 2008 Summer Olympics and 2012 Summer Olympics.

References

External links
 

Andorran male judoka
1984 births
Living people
Olympic judoka of Andorra
Judoka at the 2008 Summer Olympics
Judoka at the 2012 Summer Olympics